Akdağ ("white mountain") is the name of several different mountains in Turkey.

One of them is in the Çameli district of Denizli Province, and in the Çivril district of Afyon Province. It is located at the western end of the Taurus Mountains in Aegean Region of Turkey. Its highest peak is 3,213 m. The area was declared a national park in 2000.

There are also mountains named Akdağ in Samsun, Sivas and Burdur provinces.

References 

Mountains of Turkey
National parks of Turkey
Protected areas established in 2000
Landforms of Denizli Province